National Highway 966A or NH 966A starts at Kalamassery (junction with NH 544) and ends at Vallarpadam International Container Transhipment Terminal in Kochi, Kerala, India.

The four-lane NH connectivity is one of the pre-requisite for the setting up of the Rs 2,118-crore International Container Transhipment Terminal project of the Kochi Port at Vallarpadam.
The road start from the second bridge of the Goshree Islands Development Authority (GIDA) and stretch across the Kochi suburbs of Bolghatty Island, Moolampilly, Kothad, Cheranelloor, Manjummel and FACT Gypsum Ground to reach Kalamassery. The NH 966A is crossing the NH 66 at Cheranalloor making it the only major junction and it is  one of the biggest junction in the city and state.

The road link required building 24 bridges of varying sizes, the longest of them being nearly 1 km and has been described by the National Highways Authority of India (NHAI) sources as one of the most important infrastructure projects now on in Kerala.
The road and rail links to Vallarpadam cross each other at Mulavukadu island.
According to a rough estimate, around 10 lakh tonnes of metal was used for the project which involved erecting many stone columns as well as laying road metal filters.

See also
 List of National Highways in India (by Highway Number)
 List of National Highways in India
 National Highways Development Project

References

External links
 NH 966A on OpenStreetMap

966A
National highways in India
Roads in Ernakulam district